is a Japanese actress and gravure idol who has appeared in a number of feature films and television series. She is affiliated with Horipro.

Biography
In 2005, Midori was awarded the Grand Prix at the 30th Horipro Tarento Scout Caravan Memorial Audition 2005. The same year in May, Midori's acting debut was in GyaO's internet drama, Shojo ni wa Mukanai Shokugyo.

On April 3, 2006, her gravure debut was on the cover of Young Magazine. The following year, Midori was selected for Nippon Telegenic 2007.

Filmography

TV series

Films

References

External links
 Official profile at Horipro 
 

21st-century Japanese actresses
Japanese gravure models
Japanese television personalities
1991 births
Living people
People from Osaka Prefecture